Valley of Wanted Men, also known as Wanted Men in the United Kingdom, is a 1935 American Western film directed by Alan James.

Plot summary

Differences from source

Cast 
Frankie Darro as Slivers Sanderson
LeRoy Mason as Larry Doyle
Russell Hopton as Kelly Dillon
Grant Withers as Fred (a Ranger)
Drue Leyton as Sally Sanderson
Paul Fix as Mike Masters
Walter Miller as Ralph Dexter
Fred "Snowflake" Toones as Snowflake
Al Bridge as Ranger Sergeant Parsons
William Gould as Prison Warden
Jack Rockwell as U. S. Marshal
Slim Whitaker as Deputy
Frank Rice as Ned (storekeeper)

Soundtrack 
Irene Crane - "Livin' in the Sunshine" (Written by Chantelle Duhig and Louis Duhig)
Irene Crane - "A Living Room, Kitchen and Bath" (Written by Chantelle Duhig and Louis Duhig)

External links 

1935 films
1935 Western (genre) films
American black-and-white films
Films directed by Alan James
American Western (genre) films
1930s English-language films
1930s American films